Schweiker is a surname. Notable people with the surname include:

Mark Schweiker (born 1953), American businessman and politician
Richard Schweiker (1926–2015), American businessman and politician
William Schweiker (born 1953), American academic

See also
 Schweiker v. Chilicky, a 1988 United States Supreme Court decision
 Schweikert, a surname